The Croatian National Road Race Championships is a cycling race where the Croatian cyclists decide who will become the champion for the year to come.

Men

Elite

U23

Women

See also
Croatian National Time Trial Championships
National Road Cycling Championships

National road cycling championships
Cycle races in Croatia